The 2012 Central American Junior and Youth Championships in Athletics were held at the Estadio Nacional Flor Blanca "Magico Gonzalez" in San Salvador, El Salvador, between May 25–27, 2012. 
Organized by the Central American Isthmus Athletic Confederation (CADICA), it was the 25th edition of the Junior (U-20) and the 20th edition of the Youth (U-18) competition.
A total of 83 events were contested, 42 by boys and 41 by girls.  A total of 20 new
championship records were set.  Overall

Medal summary
Complete results can be found on the CADICA webpage.

Junior

Boys (U-20)

Girls (U-20)

Youth

Boys (U-18)

Girls (U-18)

Medal table (unofficial)

Team trophies
The placing table for team trophy awarded to the 1st place overall team (boys and girls categories) was published.

Overall

Participation
A total number of 301 athletes and officials were reported to participate in the event.

 (42)
 (70)
 (64)
 (57)
 (15)
 (21)
 Panamá (32)

References

 
International athletics competitions hosted by El Salvador
Central American Junior
Central American Junior
2012 in youth sport